Willoughby was a railway station on the East Lincolnshire Railway which served the village of Willoughby in Lincolnshire between 1848 and 1970. The withdrawal of goods facilities at Willoughby took place in 1966, followed by passenger services in 1970. All lines through the station are now closed.

History
The station was opened on 3 September 1848 to serve the village of Willoughby. This section was the last to be completed in September 1848 at an agreed cost of  £123,000 (equivalent to £ as of ). Two facing platforms were constructed to the south of a level crossing, adjacent to the stationmaster's house which provided the only passenger facilities. A goods yard to the south of the station was served by two sidings: one passing through a brick-built engine shed and a loading dock, while the other served an end dock.

Opening of the line from the coast on 23 September 1886 resulted in the construction of a new station at Willoughby in 1886–7. A new station would be built to the north of the level crossing in order to facilitate the construction of a junction between the East Lincolnshire Railway and the new line. To this end, land to the north of the crossing was purchased from the estate of Baron Willoughby de Eresby. The Great Northern Railway, which had absorbed the East Lincolnshire Railway, requested that the Sutton and Willoughby Railway pay their share of the construction costs, which amounted to £3,966 (equivalent to £ as of ). The new station opened on 4 October 1886 and the old one closed two days later, with the stationhouse being retained.

The new station was provided with three platform faces: a bay platform with a run-round loop for the Sutton line, a single platform for down services on the main line and an island platform for up services. A canopy covered both the bay and up platform. The main station buildings, consisting of a parcels office, stationmaster's office, ticket office, general waiting room, ladies' waiting room, porters' room and toilets, were situated on the up platform and branch platform. Another ladies' waiting room was located on the down platform. Two signal boxes were brought into service: one controlling the junction and bay and one controlling the crossing and goods yard movements. The second box was located behind the down platform, near a footbridge over the main line and the level crossing. The goods yard remained in its original position, but was provided with a goods shed and four sidings (two on either side of the line): one set was for coal traffic and the other for milk traffic sent out daily by the Clover Dairy factory.

On Summer Saturdays the branch service to Mablethorpe started from the main line platform instead of the bay owing to the large amount of parcels and luggage associated with holiday traffic. Willoughby station was well-kept and regularly received British Rail's "Best Kept Station" awards. In 1969 towards the end of its life, the station won the "second class" award in the annual competition which prompted the local press to recite the saying "we, who are about to die, salute you." The withdrawal of goods facilities at Willoughby was on 2 May 1966 and final closure to passengers on 5 October 1970.

Present day
The stationmaster's house from the original Willoughby station has survived, as have the brick goods shed and loading dock which are in industrial use. Very little remains of the second Willoughby station and the aid of a map is necessary to find it. The remains of the down main platform are visible from what is now a ploughed field; on the platform may be seen two concrete posts which supported the station running in board. It is still possible to access the trackbed between the platforms and one gate from the level crossing survives on the south side of the line next to the stationmaster's house which is a private residence. The footbridge was dismantled and now spans a fishing pond at nearby Burgh Le Marsh. Approximately one mile of the former Mablethorpe branch line from the station site at Willoughby has been converted into a nature reserve and footpath.

References

Sources

 
 

 
 

Disused railway stations in Lincolnshire
Railway stations in Great Britain closed in 1970
Railway stations in Great Britain opened in 1848
Former Great Northern Railway stations
Beeching closures in England